Kris Moyes (born 30 October 1978) is an Australian-born director and producer and founder of KMOYES PICTURES. He is perhaps best known for his innovative music videos.

In 2005 he directed The Presets "Are You The One?" which utilized a large array of film techniques that playfully proposed answers to who the "one" is. The video also featured a digital artifact motif he developed by interrupting the transfer of DIVX files of original footage from a PC to a MAC computer, to which many homage videos were made.

Moyes has had close ties to Modular Records since 2005. He is probably better known for his videos for Softlightes and The Presets. In 2008 Moyes directed a traditional performance based music video for Wolfmother "White Unicorn" on the condition that Pav, the head of Modular Records allowed him to deface his own work and re-release it, under the pseudonym Banditobruce. The piece of subterfuge was a reference to Marcel Duchamp's Readymade, L.H.O.O.Q.

Moyes has also directed four music videos for Sia. His first video for Sia's "Buttons" in 2007 was linked by Perez Hilton on his blog and received over 300,000 views in one day, becoming the No.1 Most Linked Music Video and No.2 Most Viewed Music Video on YouTube.

In 2010 Moyes directed and co-wrote a satirical short film, called "City Limits" featuring costumes by Australian fashion label, Romance Was Born.  It was screened at ASVOFF (A Shaded View on Fashion Film) at the Centre Pompidou, Paris.

Moyes has also been exhibited alongside John Baldessari, Brian Bress, Miranda July, Peter Sutherland, Paper Rad, Melanie Bonajo, Michael Gondry, Spike Jonze, Chris Cunningham, Mark Romanek and Floria Sigmondi.

Over the years, Moyes has appeared in a number of publications including, L.A. Times, Esquire, Tokion, The Open Day Book and The New York Times where he was invited alongside Jeff Koons, Banks Violette, Oscar de la Renta and The Campana Brothers to re-design the ' T ' Logo for The New York Times Style Magazine.

Between 2015-2018, Moyes redesigned the identity for Australia's longest running TV program RAGE, the first redesign in over 30 years.

Music videos
2006
 Softlightes - Heart Made of Sound
 Wolfmother - White Unicorn (defaced)
 The Presets - Are You The One?

2007
 The Presets - My People
 Sia - Buttons
 Softlightes - Microwave
 Architecture in Helsinki - Heart it Races

2008
 Beck - Youthless
 Sia - The Girl You Lost To Cocaine
 Franz Ferdinand - Ulysses (ver.1)
 Hercules and Love Affair - You Belong

2010
 Bag Raiders - Way Back Home
 Sia - Clap Your Hands

2011
 The Rapture - Sail Away

2012
 Kirin J. Callinan - W II W

2013
 Boy & Bear - Harlequin Dream
 Luke Temple - Florida
 Grizzly Bear - Gun-Shy
 Swift KID - Bed of Clouds (feat. Guy Sebastian)

2014
 Tokio Hotel - Girl Got a Gun
 Mosman Alder - Germland
 Grizzly Bear - Sun in Your Eyes

2015
 Birds of Tokyo - This Fire
 Birds of Tokyo - Anchor
 Mossy - Electric Chair
 Mas Ysa - Margarita
 Mysteries - Newly Thrown

2016
 Seekae - Turbine Blue
 The Temper Trap - Fall Together
 Mossy - Ginsberg
 Tkay Maidza - M.O.B.

2017
 The Presets - Do What You Want
 Gordi - On My Side
 Wrabel - We Could Be Beautiful
 Tokio Hotel - Something new

2018
 Willaris. K - Perpetual Love
 The Presets - Downtown Shutdown

Exhibitions and screenings

2007
 Melbourne International Film Festival, Victoria
 RESFest USA, Europe & Asia
 Lumen Eclipse Media Arts Gallery, Massachusetts
 Austin Museum of Digital Art, Texas

2008
 The New York Times 'T' Magazine, New York
 Art Institute of Chicago, Chicago
 Kassel Documentary Film & Video Festival, Germany
 Los Angeles Film Festival, California
 ViMus Film Festival, Portugal
 Kinofest Film Festival, Romania

2009
 Space15Twenty, California
 Microcinema, California
 Monster Children Gallery, New South Wales
 Museum of Contemporary Art, New South Wales
 FIVECC,  Spain

2010
 The Centre Pompidou, France
 Dendy Cinema, New South Wales
 Rooftop Cinema, Victoria

2011
 Remote Gallery, Spain
 Los Angeles Contemporary Exhibitions, California

2012
 Gutenberg Museum, Germany
 Chalk Horse Gallery, New South Wales
 Egoist TV, Russian Federation
 Zubroffka International Short Film Festival, Poland
 Digital Marrakech Festival, Kingdom of Morocco

2013
 Australian Centre for the Moving Image,  Victoria
 Dortmund U-Tower, Germany
 Marfa Film Festival, Texas
 53rd Kraków Film Festival, Poland
 Sugar Mountain Festival, Victoria

2015
 Marfa Film Festival, Texas

Awards and nominations

ARIA Music Awards
The ARIA Music Awards is an annual awards ceremony that recognises excellence, innovation, and achievement across all genres of Australian music. They commenced in 1987. 

! 
|-
| 2008
| Kris Moyes for The Presets "My People"
|rowspan="3"|  Best Video
| 
|rowspan="3" |  
|-
| 2010
| Kris Moyes for The Presets "Clap Your Hands"
| 
|-
| 2018
| Kris Moyes for The Presets"Do What You Want"
|

J Award
The J Awards are an annual series of Australian music awards that were established by the Australian Broadcasting Corporation's youth-focused radio station Triple J. They commenced in 2005.

|-
| J Awards of 2012
| "Way II War" (Kirin J. Callinan)
| Australian Video of the Year
| 
|-

 Sydney Music, Art & Culture Awards (2013) Best On Screen - Kirin J. Callinan - W II W
 D&AD Awards (2008) nominee Best Music Video - The Presets "My People"
 MVPA Awards (2008) nominee Best Direction of a Female Artist - Sia "Buttons"
 MVPA Awards (2008) nominee Best Electronic Music Video - The Presets "My People"
 MVPA Awards (2007) nominee Best Video Produced for Under $25,000 - Wolfmother "White Unicorn (defaced)"
 MVPA Awards (2007) nominee Best Animated Music Video - The Softlightes "Heart Made of Sound"
 Australian Dance Music Awards (2006) - The Presets "Are You The One?"
 Antville MV Awards (2006) Best Unknown/Unsigned Director

References

External links
OFFICIAL KMOYES PICTURES WEBPAGE
VIMEO
IMDB
FACEBOOK
SYDNEY MORNING HERALD ARTICLE
THE BLACKMAIL INTERVIEW

Artists from Sydney
Australian film directors
Music Video
Video directors
Music video
People from Sydney
1978 births
Living people